On October 30, 1959, Piedmont Airlines Flight 349, a Douglas DC-3, crashed on Bucks Elbow Mountain near Crozet, Virginia, killing the crew of three and all but one of its twenty-four passengers. The sole survivor, Ernest P. Bradley was seriously injured and lay on the ground near the wreckage, still strapped in his seat.

Accident 
The aircraft was on an instrument landing system (ILS) approach to Charlottesville–Albemarle Airport inbound from Washington National Airport.

Investigation 
The subsequent investigation determined the cause of the accident to be:

A navigational omission which resulted in a lateral course error that was not detected and corrected through precision instrument flying procedures. A contributing factor to the accident may have been pre-occupation of the captain resulting from mental stress.

Opposing view
The Air Line Pilots Association conducted its own investigation and came to a very different conclusion. Rather than missing the one turn on their flight, the pilot and co-pilot, according to ALPA, may have been led astray by faulty radio beacons. The ALPA report, citing numerous instances of an intermittent signal at the beacon for the Charlottesville airport, found that the beacon for a private field in Hagerstown, Maryland, could have overridden and caused the collision with the mountain.

Plane 
The accident aircraft, named  Buckeye Pacemaker, was registered as N55V and had construction number 20447. The aircraft had previously flown with Meteor Air Transport as N53593 and was sold to Piedmont Airlines in December 1956.

See also 
List of sole survivors of aviation accidents and incidents

References

External links 
"Alone on a mountain: the true story of Flight 349"
Radio interview with the first person to reach the scene.
Page about Phil Bradley, the sole survivor of the crash.
Time Magazine article about the pilot.

Albemarle County, Virginia
Airliner accidents and incidents caused by pilot error
Airliner accidents and incidents involving controlled flight into terrain
Airliner accidents and incidents in Virginia
Aviation accidents and incidents in the United States in 1959
Accidents and incidents involving the Douglas DC-3
Piedmont Airlines accidents and incidents
1959 in Virginia
October 1959 events in the United States